Protein Tob1 is a protein that in humans is encoded by the TOB1 gene.

Function 

This gene encodes a member of the tob/btg1 family of anti-proliferative proteins that have the potential to regulate cell growth. When exogenously expressed, this protein suppresses cell growth in tissue culture. The protein undergoes phosphorylation by a serine/threonine kinase, 90 kDa ribosomal S6 kinase. Interactions of this protein with the v-erb-b2 erythroblastic leukemia viral oncogene homolog 2 gene product p185 interferes with growth suppression. This protein inhibits T cell proliferation and transcription of cytokines and cyclins. The protein interacts with both mothers against decapentaplegic Drosophila homolog 2 and 4 to enhance their DNA binding activity. This interaction inhibits interleukin 2 transcription in T cells.

Interactions 

TOB1 has been shown to interact with:
 CNOT7, 
 MAPK1 
 MARCKS, 
 Mitogen-activated protein kinase 9, and
 RPS6KA1.

References

Further reading

External links